Sing with the Stars is a 1945 American short film produced by Army Pictorial Service in cooperation with the Music Section Special Services Division. The film stars Carmen Miranda and Richard Lane.

Sing with the Stars was re-released by 20th Century Fox years later as part of the Carmen Miranda Collection.

Cast 
 Carmen Miranda ... Herself
 Richard Lane ... Herself

Musical numbers 
"Tico-Tico no Fubá"
"I, Yi, Yi, Yi, Yi (I Like You Very Much)"
"Mamãe Eu Quero"
"K-K-K-Katy"

See also 
 Carmen Miranda filmography

References

American short films
American World War II propaganda shorts
1945 films
Carmen Miranda
American black-and-white films
1940s American films